Balkanabat, formerly Nebit-Dag and Neftedag, is the capital city of Balkan Province, the largest province in Turkmenistan. It lies at the foot of the Balkan Daglary mountain range. Balkanabat is about 450 km west of Ashgabat and 160 km east of the seaport city of Turkmenbashy. The city layout is a grid of apartment blocks called kvartal (quarters). The main streets are Magtymguly, Pervomayskiy and Gurbansoltan eje şaýoly.

Etymology

The town was founded in 1933 as Neftedag, meaning "Oil Mountain" (Russian neft, "oil", and Turkmen dag, "mountain"), as a settlement along one of the stations of the Trans-Caspian Railway. In 1946, when it was transformed into a city, it was renamed "Nebit-Dag", also meaning "Oil Mountain", but this time using the Turkmen word nebit. Nebit Dag was renamed Balkanabat (Balkan from the name of the Balkan mountains (not to be confused with the Balkan mountains in Bulgaria), abat – meaning  “settlement” in Persian) in 2001 by decree of former President of Turkmenistan Saparmurat Niyazov.

History
A large monument at the far western end of the city, "Pioneers", also called "Desert Explorers", depicts a camel, Ivan Gubkin, and Gubkin's peers, struggling to hike through the windy Karakum Desert while prospecting for petroleum. Balkanabat's history is tightly linked to the petroleum deposits in Goturdepe, Barsagelmes and Nebitdag. The first colonists had to live in unbelievable conditions in tents, tilt carts, without power and even without water.

Amenities
The city adjoins a "Health Path", a concrete circuit hike path to give a moderate hike along the mountainside. It was opened in 2004 in the template of that of Ashgabat. The city has five bazaars (markets) Gök, Jennet, Gündogar, Bereket and 5th Microdistrict bazaar. The city is served by two hotels, Nebitçi and Sport, a theater, museums, restaurants and parks. The north side of town features the large Saparmyrat Türkmenbaşy Park, which offers trees, tennis courts, a life-size chess board and many benches.

In the 2000s, the city underwent street improvement, construction of large housing facilities and additional amenities. The State Drama Theater, the Museum of History and Local Lore, a diagnostic center, a wedding palace, the Balkanabat Railway Station, the Balkan Provincial Library, a stadium with 10,000 seats, a general oriental market, and other social and cultural facilities were built during that period.

Demographics
In 2011 the population was estimated to be 120,800 residents, 80% of them Turkmen (mainly Yomud tribe), 15% Russians, 3% Kazakhs, 2% Azerbaijanis, 10% others, including Lezgins, Armenians, Uzbeks, Tatars, and Jews. The Yomud tribe is associated with the Balkan region and the Yomud carpet göl (rosette) is one of the five rosettes represented on the Turkmen flag.

Climate
Balkanabat has a cold desert climate (BWk) according to the Köppen climate classification.

Industry, economy and transport

The city is an industrial center for petroleum and natural gas production. A branch office of the Russian petroleum company Tatneft is located in Balkanabat. Animal husbandry and production of wheat and cotton are other pursuits.

Transport 
The city lies on the east-west M37 highway and is connected to other cities by rail and bus. While there is no official cab company, private citizens operate shared cabs.

Air 
The Balkanabat Airport terminal was opened in October 2004 with a design capacity of 200 passengers per hour. At present Turkmenistan Airlines offers no scheduled service in or out of this airport.

Rail 
Balkanabat sits on the Trans-Caspian Railway running east–west, connecting the capital, Ashgabat, with the Balkan Region. The railway offers both passenger and freight transport. Balkanabat Railway Station is the city's main rail station.

Communication
The city has one mobile operator, Altyn Asyr. Internet access and cable TV are provided by Turkmentelecom. There is one internet cafe in the city. Turkmenpochta is the official national postal service of Turkmenistan. It currently operates four post offices in the city.

Education

The city has an Oil and Gas Industry School, which operates as a branch of the International Oil and Gas University. The school trains students in such specialties as geology, drilling of oil and gas wells, development and operation of oil and gas fields, chemical technology of oil and gas processing, construction, operation of oil and gas storage, and oil and gas pipeline operation. It is the functional successor to the Polytechnic Institute, which was an extension of the Gubkin Russian State University of Oil and Gas in Moscow during the Soviet period.

High school graduates may receive secondary-specialized education in the following vocational schools: Balkanabat Medical School, Special School of Arts, Financial and Economic Secondary Vocational School, and Oil Secondary Vocational School of the Turkmennebit State Concern.

Religion 
The main mosque of Balkan Province has a capacity of 3,000 worshipers. Four minarets, each 63 meters high, rise above the two-story mosque. The Russian Orthodox Church of the Nativity of the Holy Virgin has operated since 1997 in the 13th microdistrict.

Culture 
A giant yurt-shaped building, Türkmeniň ak öýi ("Turkmen White House") was built for special events in 2021. The complex includes a concert hall with 3,000 seats and additional buildings, as well as a special sadaqah hall of the same capacity.

Notable people 
 
Gulshat Orazmuhammedova (born 1974), Turkmen statesman

Media 
The daily state newspaper Balkan is published in Balkanabat.

Twin towns and sister cities 
 Almetyevsk

Sports 
The city features the Balkanabat Sport Toplumy stadium, at which is based the Nebitçi professional football club, which plays in the Ýokary Liga ("Upper League").

See also 
 Balkanabat Stadium
 FC Balkan
 Railway stations in Turkmenistan

References 

Populated places in Balkan Region
Cities and towns built in the Soviet Union
Populated places established in 1933